Kulynychi is an urban-type settlement in Kharkiv Raion of Kharkiv Oblast in Ukraine. This is an eastern suburb of the city of Kharkiv. Kulynychi belongs to Kharkiv urban hromada, one of the hromadas of Ukraine. Population: 

In 2013, Kharkiv Oblast Rada voted to merge the settlement to the city of Kharkiv. However, as of 2022, the population statistics estimate published by the State Statistics Service of Ukraine still listed Kulynychi as a separate urban-type settlement.

Economy

Transportation
The settlement is included in the road network of Kharkiv.

Industrialnaya railway station is located in Kulynychi but it does not have passenger traffic. This is a terminal station on a branch from Kharkiv. The closest station with passenger traffic is Traktornyi Zavod of Kharkiv Metro.

References

Urban-type settlements in Kharkiv Raion